Dryobalanops beccarii, or Kapur Keladan, is a species of plant in the family Dipterocarpaceae. The species is named after Odoardo Beccari, 1843–1920, an Italian explorer and botanist. It is found in Peninsular Malaysia and Borneo. It is a large emergent tree, up to 65 m tall, found in mixed dipterocarp forests on shallow leached soils over both sandstone and shale. It is a heavy hardwood sold under the trade names of  Kapur. It is recorded from at least four protected areas (Bako, Gunung Mulu, Crocker Range and Ulu Temburong National Parks).

References

  Listed as Endangered (CR A1cd+2 cd D v2.3)

beccarii
Trees of Peninsular Malaysia
Trees of Borneo
Flora of Sabah
Endangered flora of Asia